Kjøbenhavns Sporvei-Selskab (KSS) was an operator of tramways in Copenhagen, Denmark.

History
Kjøbenhavns Sporvei-Selskab was founded by C. F. Tietgen in 1865 as a replacement of the UK-owned Copenhagen Railway Company, which had opened Copenhagen's first tram line in 1863 but had been liquidated. It developed into the largest operator of tram lines in the city before it was merged with four other companies under the name De kjøbenhavnske Sporveje on 1 August 1898.

Depots
 Allégade
 Augustagade 
 Frederiksberg Allé
 Gartnergade 
 Nordre Frihavnsgade
 Slukefter 
 Valby 
 Vester Fælledvej

Lines

See also
 Kjøbenhavns Forstæders Sporveisselskab

References

Danish companies established in 1865
1898 disestablishments in Denmark
Rail transport in Copenhagen